The 2019 NHRA Mello Yello Drag Racing Season was announced on July 25, 2018.

It was the 64th season of the National Hot Rod Association's top drag racing competition. There were 24 Top Fuel and Funny Car events, 22 Pro Stock events (18 Championship NHRA Formula and 4 Non-Championship Mountain Motor Formula), and 16 Pro Stock Motorcycle events.

Schedule

* Finals televised on tape delay.

MM Pro Stock Car at this event is a non-championship race featuring the Mountain Motor formula, which has no engine displacement limit, can use carburetors or electronic fuel injection, and weighs a minimum of 2,450 pounds, compared to the NHRA Pro Stock formula that features electronic fuel injection, a 500ci (8193cc) engine displacement limit, and 2,350 pounds weight.  All two-lane Mountain Motor races (except Charlotte) will feature eight-car fields.  The four-lane Charlotte round will feature a full 16-car field.

Additional Rules for Specially Marked Races
4 Lanes:  The Four-Wide Nationals in both Las Vegas and Charlotte in the spring will compete with cars on four lanes.
 All cars will qualify on each lane as all four lanes will be used in qualifying.
 Three rounds with cars using all four lanes.
 In Rounds One and Two, the top two drivers (of four) will advance to the next round.
 The pairings are set as follows:
 Race One:  1, 8, 9, 16
 Race Two:  4, 5, 12, 13
 Race Three:  2, 7, 10, 15
 Race Four:  3, 6, 11, 14
 Semifinal One:  Top two in Race One and Race Two
 Semifinal Two:  Top two in Race Three and Race Four
 Finals:  Top two in Semifinal One and Semifinal Two
 Lane choice determined by times in previous round.  In first round, lane choice determined by fastest times.
 Drivers who advance in Rounds One and Two will receive 20 points for each round advancement.
 In Round Three, the winner of the race will be declared the race winner and will collect 40 points.  The runner-up will receive 20 points.  Third and fourth place drivers will be credited as semifinal losers.

1.5:  The U. S. Nationals and Auto Club Finals will have their race points increased by 50% .  Drivers who qualify but are eliminated in the first round receive 30 points, and each round win is worth 30 points.  The top four receive 10, 9, 8, and 7 points, respectively, for qualifying positions, with the 5–6 drivers receiving 6 points, 7–8 drivers receiving 5 points, 9–12 receiving 4 points, and 13–16 receiving 3 points.  Also, the top four, not three, drivers after each session receive points for fastest times in each round (4-3-2-1).

MM:  Pro Stock Car at this event is a non-championship race with the Mountain Motor formula.

Event changes
The race events in Topeka, Kansas and Petersburg, Virginia have switched dates for this year, with the Virginia NHRA Nationals taking place in May and the Menards NHRA Heartland Nationals in June. In the Countdown, the race events in Charlotte, North Carolina and Ennis, Texas have switched weekends for this year in October. All other events during this season remain on the same schedule, although a couple of them either moved up or down a weekend.  Scheduling changes made primarily to avoid NASCAR events in the markets.

NHRA 500ci EFI Pro Stock Car will only be racing in 18 events this year, down from 24 events last year.  Four of the races that they will not participate will feature non-championship exhibition Mountain Motor Pro Stock Cars (over-500 ci engines with carburetors). Those races include Houston, Charlotte 1, Bristol and Epping.

2: Due to inclement weather throughout the day, Final Elimination Rounds at the Lucas Oil NHRA Winternationals in Pomona, California were postponed until 10 AM PST on February 11, 2019. The first round of eliminations were underway until rain suspended any additional racing.

3: Final Elimination Rounds at the NTK NHRA Carolina Nationals in Concord, North Carolina were postponed until 9 AM EDT on October 14, 2019 due to inclement weather.

Final standings

References

External links
 Official website
 Drag Race Central The Latest NHRA News and Analysis

NHRA Camping World Drag Racing Series
2019 in American motorsport